Sarmantayevka is a rural locality (a selo) in Multanovsky Selsoviet of Volodarsky District, Astrakhan Oblast, Russia. The population was 152 as of 2010. There is 1 street.

Geography 
Sarmantayevka is located 24 km southeast of Volodarsky (the district's administrative centre) by road. Multanovo is the nearest rural locality.

References 

Rural localities in Volodarsky District, Astrakhan Oblast